Stomper the Maverick is the mascot for the Minnesota State Mavericks athletics teams of the Minnesota State University, Mankato and the associated club teams and charities. During the year, Stomper makes over 250 appearances and is at virtually all home games for University teams as well as regional and charity fund raisers.

Stomper is known for helping to rally the fans and crowds at sporting events through various antics. He can be seen as part of giveaways and other competitions and is often playfully waving to children. Several events, locations and areas are named for Stomper. For example, the University works in collaboration with Mankato Transit Service to run the Stomper Express, a transit service for students.

History
The athletics teams of Minnesota State University, Mankato have changed over the years. Initially as a teacher preparatory college there was no formal mascot until the 1920s when the nickname the "peds" was used to refer to the pedagogues an informal reference to teachers. In the 1950s the mascot the Indians were adopted, but this was dropped in 1976 due to the fact that Native American groups saw this as not representative of their culture. During 1977 there was a competition to come up with a new mascot. During the same time then Mankato State University was transitioning to a new athletic conference, the North Central Conference. The winning suggestion was from Professor Roy Cook, a native of Minnesota, who suggested the Maverick. The Maverick is a wild powerful steer, unbranded and unyielding.

The name "Stomper" (nickname of the school mascot) was announced during Homecoming festivies in 1993 (officially unveiled Oct. 14, 1993). Libby (Albers) Furry (Class of 1997) was the inaugural mascot. Over the years Stomper has had different designs, with the most recent redesign in 2006.

References

External links
 

Minnesota State University, Mankato
Minnesota State Mavericks
College mascots in the United States
Fictional ungulates
Animal mascots
Fictional characters from Minnesota
Mascots introduced in 1977